NDDB is an initialism that may stand for:

 National Dairy Development Board
 Niger Delta Development Board, now the Niger Delta Development Commission
 National Doctor Database